W. B. Yeats, Lady Gregory and Edward Martyn published a "Manifesto for Irish Literary Theatre" in 1897, in which they proclaimed their intention of establishing a national theatre for Ireland.

The Irish Literary Theatre was founded by Yeats, Lady Gregory, George Moore and Edward Martyn in Dublin, Ireland, in 1899. It proposed to give performances in Dublin of Irish plays by Irish authors.

In 1899 Lady Gregory secured a temporary licence for a play to be given at the Antient Concert Rooms in Great Brunswick St in Dublin, and so enabled the Irish Literary Theatre to give its first production. The play chosen was The Countess Cathleen by W. B. Yeats. It was done by a very efficient London company that included Miss May Whitty (Dame May Webster) and Mr. Ben Webster. The next production given was Martyn's play The Heather Field. In the following year the Irish Literary Theatre produced at the Gaiety Theatre three plays: Maeve by Edward Martyn, The Last Feast of Fianna by Alice Milligan, and The Bending of the Bough by George Moore. The Bending of the Bough was staged during the Boer War which begun on 11 October 1899.

The Irish Literary Theatre project lasted until 1901, when it collapsed due to lack of funding.

The use of non-Irish actors in these productions was perceived to be a failure, and a new group of Irish players was put together by the Fay brothers, among others. These went on to form the Irish National Theatre Society, which led to the Abbey Theatre.

See also 
 Ulster Literary Theatre

External links
 The Advent of the Irish Dramatic Movement: From Politics to Drama by Kaoru Imanishi. Archived version here.

References

1899 establishments in Ireland
Theatres in Ireland
1901 disestablishments in Europe